Saul Cornell, is the Paul and Diane Guenther Chair in American History at Fordham University. He was Professor of history at Ohio State University and the Director of the Second Amendment Research Center at the John Glenn Institute.

Life 
He received a PhD from the University of Pennsylvania in 1989  and is now one of the nation’s leading authorities on early American constitutional thought.

He is the author of The Other Founders: Anti-Federalism and the Dissenting Tradition in America (1999) for which he won the 2001 Cox Book Prize and A Well-Regulated Militia: the Founding Fathers and the Origins of Gun Control in America (2006). He is also the co-author of many other publications, including the textbook Visions of America: A History of the United States (2009).  Recently, he authored an article on Salon regarding the 2011 Tucson shooting and Gun Control.

In addition to book writing, he has contributed to numerous Amicus curiae briefs in court cases involving the 2nd Amendment.  Most notably, he is the co-author of an Amicus Brief supporting Washington D.C.'s hand gun ban filed in District of Columbia v. Heller. and New York State Rifle & Pistol Association Inc. v. Bruen.

Works 

 	Jennifer D Keene; Saul Cornell; Edward T O'Donnell Visions of America: A History of the United States (2009) 
 A Well-Regulated Militia: the Founding Fathers and the Origins of Gun Control in America (2006) 
 The Other Founders: Anti-Federalism and the Dissenting Tradition in America (1999)

References

External links
Saul Cornell - Google Books
Saul Cornell - Fordham University Faculty

Fordham University faculty
Ohio State University faculty
University of Pennsylvania alumni
21st-century American historians
21st-century American male writers
Living people
Year of birth missing (living people)
American male non-fiction writers